Chorizoporidae is a family of bryozoans belonging to the order Cheilostomatida.

Genera:
 Chorizopora Hincks, 1879
 Costulostega Tilbrook, 2006

References

Bryozoan families